The 1964 United States presidential election in Missouri took place on November 3, 1964, as part of the 1964 United States presidential election. Voters chose 12 representatives, or electors, to the Electoral College, who voted for president and vice president.

Missouri was won by incumbent President Lyndon B. Johnson (D–Texas), with 64.05% of the popular vote, against Senator Barry Goldwater (R–Arizona), with 35.95% of the popular vote. , this is the last time that Perry County, Holt County, Lawrence County, Jasper County, Polk County, Greene County, Cooper County, Newton County, Cape Girardeau County, Barry County, St. Charles County, and Barton County voted for a Democratic Presidential candidate.

Results

Results by county

See also
 United States presidential elections in Missouri

References

Missouri
1964
1964 Missouri elections